Stanley is a constituency of the Legislative Assembly of the Falkland Islands which has been in existence since the first elections in the Falklands in 1949. The constituency of Stanley consists of the area that lies within 3.5 miles of the spire of Christ Church Cathedral. This covers the city of Stanley, which is the largest settlement in the Falklands representing almost 75% of the total population of the islands (excluding military personnel). Stanley is one of two constituencies in the Falklands, the other being Camp.

The first elections to the Legislative Council (the predecessor of the Legislative Assembly) took place in 1949 and elected two members from Stanley. The number of members was reduced to one at the 1977 election with the implementation of the Falkland Islands (Legislative Council) (Amendment) Order 1977. In 1985 the Falkland Islands Constitution came into force which increased the number of members from Stanley to four, elected through block voting. This was increased to five in 1997 following a constitutional amendment, giving the members from Stanley a majority of the elected seats. In 2009 a new constitution came into force which replaced the Legislative Council with the Legislative Assembly, with all members of the Legislative Council becoming members of the new Legislative Assembly.

In referendums in 2001, 2011 and 2020, a proposal was put to the people of the Falklands for the Stanley and Camp constituencies to be abolished and replaced with a single constituency for the entire territory.  The proposal was rejected on all three occasions, but in the 2011 and 2020 referendums a majority of voters in Stanley supported the proposal.

Members

References 

Constituencies in the Falkland Islands